Nicklaus Robert Shoulders is an American country singer-songwriter from Fayetteville, Arkansas. After achieving local success with his punk rock band Thunderlizards in the early 2010s and playing harmonica and banjo with Shawn James and the Shapeshifters, in 2017 Shoulders began releasing country music as a solo artist. His solo work has reached a much wider audience, beginning with a performance of his original song "Rather Low" gathering considerable momentum on YouTube. Shoulders has been praised for his distinctive vocal style, which incorporates influences from early country music in the form of yodelling and whistling.

In addition to his music, Nick is also an accomplished illustrator having attended Rocky Mountain College of Art and Design in Denver, CO. His artwork has been notably featured on beer cans of the Fossil Cove Brewing Company in Fayetteville, AR. He has created additional mural installations in Fayetteville at The Smoke and Barrel Tavern  and The Little Bread Company. 

Shoulders has been outspoken in questioning the culture of modern country music: In a 2020 article for In These Times, he criticized "fake twang" – the imitation of the Southern accent by musicians who are not from the American South, considering this practice symptomatic of the close association between mainstream country music, whiteness. and Conservatism in the United States. This association, he argued, failed to "acknowledge the diverse and complicated origin of these uniquely American musical forms", as well as the diversity of the rural United States as a whole, and he expressed the aspiration to help make country music "more accessible and more welcoming to people outside of the white rural experience".

Discography
 Lonely Like Me (2017)
 Okay, Crawdad (2019)
 Home on the Rage (2021)
 Heart of Night (EP) (2022)

References 

Country musicians from Arkansas
21st-century American musicians

1989 births
Living people